Conus alexisallaryi is a species of sea snail, a marine gastropod mollusk, in the family Conidae, the cone snails and their allies.

Description
The length of the holotype measures 49.5 mm.

Distribution
This marine species occurs off the Solomon Islands.

References

 Cossignani T., 2018. Pionoconus alexisallaryi, nuovo cono. Malacologia Mostra Mondiale 101: 24-26

alexisallaryi